DPS may refer to:

Schools

United States
 Dalton Public Schools, the public school district in Dalton, Georgia
 Dearborn Public Schools, the public school district in Dearborn, Michigan
 Decatur Public Schools District 61, the public school system in Decatur, Illinois
 Denver Public Schools, the public school system in Denver, Colorado
 Detroit Public Schools, the public school system in Detroit, Michigan
 Durham Public Schools, the public school system in Durham, North Carolina

Other countries
 Delhi Public School, private schools run by the Delhi Public School Society
 Delhi Private School, Dubai, United Arab Emirates
 Delhi Private School, Sharjah, United Arab Emirates
 Divisional Public School, a school in Lahore and Faisalabad, Pakistan
 Dawood Public School, a private school in Karachi, Pakistan

Politics and government
 Democratic Party of Socialists of Montenegro, a political party in Montenegro
 Department of Protection-Security (Département Protection et Sécurité), a branch of the National Front (FN) political party of France
 Department of Public Safety, a type of state or local government umbrella agency in the United States
 Public Safety Canada, legally incorporated as the Department of Public Safety and Emergency Preparedness, a Canadian federal cabinet-level department
 Diplomatic Protection Squad, VIP protection unit of the New Zealand Police
 Directorate of Professional Standards, a division of the London Metropolitan Police
 Dorozhno-Patrulnaya Sluzhba, Russia's Road Inspection Service, a division of the Russian police responsible for regulating road traffic
 Dvizhenie za Prava i Svobodi (ДПС), known as the Movement for Rights and Freedoms, a political party in Bulgaria

Technology
 Data Processing Systems Engineer, a flight engineer responsible for data processing systems in a space flight
 Descent Propulsion System, a rocket engine used in Apollo's Lunar Module
 Degrees per second, a unit for measuring angular velocity
 Direct Print Standard, part of PictBridge standard
 Display PostScript, an on-screen display system
 Dynamic positioning system, a means to automatically maintain a ship's position and heading by using her own propellers and thrusters
 DPS protocol, a quantum key distribution protocol

Biology
 Dps (DNA-binding proteins from starved cells), a class of proteins
 Distinct population segment, a population considered for protection under the U.S. Endangered Species Act

Other uses
 Ngurah Rai International Airport (IATA code), near the city of Denpasar, Bali, Indonesia
 DPS Compound, Baguio, Philippines
 Damage per second, a way to calculate the damage dealt in online multiplayer games
 Dead Poets Society, from the film of the same name
 The Dead Pop Stars, a Japanese rock band
 Dps (band), a Japanese rock band
 Deltic Preservation Society, a railway preservation group based in the United Kingdom
 Desha Putra Sammanaya, a military decoration in Sri Lanka
 Division for Planetary Sciences within the American Astronomical Society
 Doctor of Professional Studies, a professional doctorate
 Dramatists Play Service, an American publisher of plays
 Department for Protection and Security, a French security organization
 Designated Premises Supervisor, in British law the person with day-to-day responsibility for a premises where alcohol is sold
 Double Page Spread, also called Two-page spread, or simply "spread", referring to  two adjacent, facing pages in a magazine or other publication with conjoined or connected content
 2,2'-Dipyridyldisulfide, an oxidizing agent and a reagent for forming 2-pyridinethiol esters in the Corey-Nicolaou macrolactonization
 Deposit Protection Service, a company authorised by the UK government to run Tenancy deposit schemes

See also
 DP (disambiguation)